The Highlands Masonic Lodge, also known as the Pythian Building, is a historic building located in Denver, Colorado.  Built in 1905 and constructed in the Classical Revival style, it was listed on the National Register of Historic Places in 1995.

Originally constructed as a meeting place for the Knights of Pythias, it was later the meeting place of Highlands Lodge No. 86, Ancient Free and Accepted Masons.

It is a two-story red brick front-gabled building with four gray brick pilasters in its symmetrical front facade. Its cornice and pediment are supported by decorative brackets.

It is unusual for a Classical Revival building to have been front-gabled, but that configuration can work well in a narrow lot as here.

See also
Masonic Temple Building (Denver, Colorado), also NRHP-listed

References

Neoclassical architecture in Colorado
Buildings and structures in Denver
Knights of Pythias buildings
Former Masonic buildings in Colorado
Clubhouses on the National Register of Historic Places in Colorado
National Register of Historic Places in Denver